502 Züm Main is a bus rapid transit route in Brampton, Ontario which leads south into Mississauga, Ontario. The second corridor, which began service on September 6, 2011, runs from Sandalwood Parkway in the city's north end to MiWay's City Centre Transit Terminal near the Square One Shopping Centre in the south. It travels via the Downtown Brampton and Brampton Gateway terminals along Main and Hurontario Streets through Brampton and Mississauga. It covers the route of current route 2, which has frequent rush-hour service. Route 502 extends and replace MiWay's route 102 InterCity Express. It runs every 10 minutes during rush hours and 20 minutes off-peak hours, including weekends. Route 2's rush hour frequency was reduced to 20 minutes to optimize ridership.

A large portion of this route overlaps Mississauga's Hurontario Street corridor. Miway provides frequent local and express services on this corridor south of Steeles Avenue, with the section between Eglinton and Britannia being served with 3-minute frequencies.

Hurontario/Main Street from Lakeshore Road to Queen Street will eventually be converted to a LRT system. The leftover of the eventual Route 502 (north of Brampton GO Station) will remain and possibly extended to Highway 410 in the north. As a preparation, both MiWay Route 103 and Züm Main overlap express service between Shoppers World Brampton and Eglinton Avenue.

The southern portion of this route below Steeles Avenue will eventually be replaced by the planned Hurontario LRT.

Stops

See also
Hurontario LRT

References

Züm bus routes
2011 establishments in Ontario